The , abbreviated as , is the nationwide law for radio station and television licensing in the Federal Republic of Germany.

The full title of the law is  but on most occasions it is called Rundfunkstaatsvertrag. The first version was enacted on 1 December 1987 (signed on 3 April 1987) and the fifteenth revision of 30 October 2010 is due to come into effect on 1 January 2013.

Some aspects were refined by the federal  ( – ) that is otherwise covering Internet services.

The German public broadcasting services were introduced in post-war Germany in a similar fashion to the British Broadcasting Corporation. The  is similar to the royal charter of the BBC however the licensing and financing model diverged over time. The  was introduced in 1987 to allow licensing of private broadcast companies beyond the public broadcast services that existed before.

See also 
 

Government of Germany
Broadcasting in Germany